Kaan Kevser-Junior (born 2004) is an English footballer who recently played as a midfielder for  club Crawley Town.

Career
Having trained with the club since the start of the 2021–22 season, Kevser-Junior signed for EFL League Two club Crawley Town on a two-year deal with the option for a further year in October 2021.

On 2 March 2023, Kevser-Junior left Crawley Town by mutual consent.

Style of play
Kevser-Junior can play as a number 10 or on the wing. He has compared his style of play to Eden Hazard.

Personal life
Born in England, Kevser-Junior is of Turkish descent.

References

External links

2004 births
Living people
English footballers
English people of Turkish descent
Association football midfielders
Crawley Town F.C. players